Teklehaimanot is a surname of Ethiopian origin. It is derived from the name of an Ethiopian monk and saint, Tekle Haymanot ( – ). People with that name include:
  (born before 2008), Ethiopian football player and coach.
 Daniel Teklehaimanot (born 1988), Eritrean professional road racing cyclist
  (born 1987), Ethiopian international football player
 Hailu Tekle Haymanot (AKA Hailu II of Gojjam, 1868–1950), Ethiopian nobleman and military commander
 Kidane-Mariam Teklehaimanot (1933-2009), bishop of the Ethiopian Catholic Church

See also
 Abuna Takla Haymanot (1918-1988), third Patriarch of the Ethiopian Orthodox Tewahido Church
 Mara Takla Haymanot (10th century), Emperor of Ethiopia
 Tekle Haymanot (disambiguation)

Surnames of African origin